Tapani Kaarle Heikinpoika Brotherus (born June 12, 1938, in Copenhagen, Denmark) is a Finnish diplomat who was acting as a Finnish Chargé d'affaires in Chile during the 1973 coup d'état led by General Augusto Pinochet. Brotherus saved hundreds of Chilean dissidents from death during the coup.

Background and career
Tapani Brotherus was born into a Helsinki-based cultural family. His grandfather K. R. Brotherus (1880–1949) was Professor of Political Science and Rector of the University of Helsinki. Tapani's father, Heikki Brotherus (1909–1985) was a diplomat and author.

At the time of the Chilean coup, Tapani Brotherus was a 35-year-old diplomat. He was stationed in Santiago de Chile a couple of years earlier by the first embassy in Finland, where he was acting as trustee. During the Socialist President Salvador Allende's administration, Finland had a great deal of cooperation with Chile in the forest and mining sectors.

After five Chilean years, Brotherus' career continued as an ambassador in Tehran, Islamabad, Pretoria, and Athens

Chilean coup of 1973
General Augusto Pinochet deposed Socialist President Salvador Allende on September 11, 1973. In the capture, the junta killed at least 3,000 and captured tens of thousands Chileans.

Chargé d'affaires Tapani Brotherus and Deputy Counselor Ilkka Jaamala's work was based on a secret decision made by them to act against the official guidelines of Foreign Ministry and Finnish asylum policy. They channeled aid by organizing refugees from the country. It has been calculated that Brotherus was able to take 182 Chileans to Finland and 1,700 to East Germany, and that by the improvisation of Brotherus he was able to secure about 500 refugees. Brotherus' "balance" was up to 2,500 rescued people.

Matti Tuovinen, Head of the Political Department of the Ministry of Foreign Affairs and other UM leaders, tolerated Brotherus's activities. After five Chilean years, Brotherus' career continued as an ambassador in Tehran, Islamabad, Pretoria and Athens.

After his retirement, Tapani Brotherus has continued human rights and solidarity work with free civic activities. He has been awarded the Tammisaari Medal of the People's Education Fund 2010. The state of Finland recognized Brotherus’ work in Chile by Foreign Minister Alexander Stubb in the form of coffee and a bun.

References 

Finnish human rights activists
Ambassadors of Finland to Greece
Ambassadors of Finland to Iran
1938 births
People from Copenhagen
Living people
Ambassadors of Finland to South Africa
Ambassadors of Finland to Pakistan
Refugees in Finland